Dorney is a surname. Notable people with the surname include:

Alan Dorney (born 1947), British footballer
Esmond Dorney (1906–1991), Australian architect
Jack Dorney (born 1990), British footballer
John Dorney, British writer and actor
Keith Dorney (born 1957), American football player
Kiernan Dorney (1912–2007), Australian surgeon 
Mick Dorney (1884–1952), Irish hurler
Sean Dorney (born 1951), Australian journalist
William Dorney (1891–?), Irish hurler

See also 
 Dorny